Cédric Cambon (born 20 September 1986) is a retired former French professional footballer who last played for US Orléans as a defender.

Club career
Born in Montpellier, Cambon started playing football as a youth in Cournonterral, where he was noticed by scouts from Montpellier HSC in 1995. He started playing for the professional team in 2003. In 2007 he signed with Litex Lovech, he returned to France in January 2009 and signed with Thonon Évian F.C.

On 9 July 2015, Cambon signed a three-year contract with Le Havre. In his debut with Havre, on 31 July 2015, he scored his first goal for the club in a 3–1 away win.

On 24 July 2017, Cambon signed with Orléans on a two-year contract.

Cambon announced his retirement from football in June 2020, having been released by Orléans at the end of the 2019–20 season.

International career
In 2005 Cambon became European champion with the France U19 team.

Honours
Litex Lovech
 Bulgarian Cup: 2008

Évian
 Ligue 2: 2010–11

References

External links
 
 
 foot-national.com Profile

1986 births
Living people
French footballers
Association football defenders
Montpellier HSC players
PFC Litex Lovech players
French expatriate sportspeople in Bulgaria
First Professional Football League (Bulgaria) players
Expatriate footballers in Bulgaria
Thonon Evian Grand Genève F.C. players
Le Havre AC players
US Orléans players
Ligue 2 players
Ligue 1 players
France youth international footballers